Hypotaenidia is a genus of birds in the family Rallidae. The genus is considered separate by the IOC and IUCN, while The Clements Checklist of Birds of the World / eBird consider the species to be part of Gallirallus.

Species
It contains the following species:

Extant

Extinct

References

External links

 
Bird genera
Taxa named by Ludwig Reichenbach